Faces is the debut solo album released by Savatage guitarist Chris Caffery in 2005. The album was released in a double CD edition, but other editions exist, including a one disc, two disc digipak, and two disc digipak with bonus tracks.

Track listing
All songs by Chris Caffery, except where indicated

CD one
"Alas" - 1:33
"Faces" - 4:36
"Fade into the X" - 5:13
"Pisses Me Off" - 5:24
"Remember" - 4:42
"Fall" - 4:03
"Music Man" - 4:52
"Life Crazy Life" - 4:31
"Mold" - 5:03
"Bag o'Bones" (Caffery, Steve Broderick) - 3:31
"Evil Is as Evil Does" - 3:19
"Never" - 6:43
"So Far Today" - 4:48
"Jealousy" - 6:05
"Preludio" - 4:56
"Abandoned" - 6:50

CD two - The Damn War
"God Damn War" - 6:33
"Fool, Fool!" - 2:56
"Edge of Darkness" - 4:10
"Saddamize" - 7:37
"I" - 4:33
"W.A.R.P.E.D." - 3:34
"Fright Knights" - 6:37
"Amazing Grace" - 1:36
"Piece Be with You" - 5:53
"Beat Me, You'll Never Beat Me" (Caffery, Jon Oliva) - 5:59
"Curtains" - 3:13

Credits
Chris Caffery - lead and backing vocals, all instruments, producer, engineer, mixing
Paul Morris - keyboards, piano
Dave Z - bass guitar
Jeff Plate - drums, percussion
Dave Eggar - cello
George Kokonas - lute, backing vocals
Nik Chinboukas - keyboards, backing vocals, producer, engineer, mixing
Pete Benjamin - engineer

References

External links 
 Chris Caffery's official website
 Chris Caffery on MySpace

2005 debut albums
Chris Caffery albums